Diego Pérez Moreno (15-16?) was a Spanish Military, Alcalde of Buenos Aires during the Viceroyalty of Peru.

Biography 

Diego Pérez Moreno was born in Córdoba,  son of Juan Pérez Moreno (conquistador). He was married to Antonia de Escobar, descendant of General Alonso de Escobar. His son, Diego Pérez Moreno y Escobar was regidor in the city. A daughter, Mariana was wife of Captain Andrés Lozano descendant of conquistadores Domingo Gribeo Martín and Andrés Lozano de la Era (1562-1624) (born in Salamanca).

References 

1500s births
1600s deaths
Spanish military personnel
Spanish colonial governors and administrators